Burrows Court is a high rise residential building in the Sneinton neighbourhood in Nottingham, United Kingdom. The building consists of 130 flats and has stood empty since 2005, with plans announced in 2018 for its refurbishment.

History
Construction of the building began in 1966 and were completed a year later following slum clearance in the area. Like many residential high rise buildings during the 1960s, Burrows Court was seen as 'the future of housing' and was seen as a modern and efficient building in comparison to the slums during the United Kingdom's industrial age.

27 years after the residential building was built, the tower went under a major refurbishment from 1994 to 1995. The exterior of the building was painted white, as well as window replacements and concrete repairments, and is now the current appearance of the building exterior.

Despite the refurbishment, nearly half of the flats in the building were vacant, and Nottingham City Council facing a bill of £4 million from refurbishments to the building. Crime, drug dealing and anti-social behaviour was being reported in the tower and the surrounding area.

The residential building was sold in 2005 to a private developer, and the remaining tenants of the block of flats were re-housed by the Nottingham City Council. Since 2005, the building has stood empty and is commonly seen as a notorious eyesore known for its broken windows and crime rate.

Crime
Crime has become a major issue in the tower and the surrounding area, before and after the building was sold and left vacant. Before the building was sold, the council was reporting offenses including drug dealing and anti-social behaviour, which was attributed to its isolated location.

After the building was left empty, it has been a hotspot for vandals, squatters and drug dealers. In 2013 the building was the scene of the murder of Kevin Kennedy, whose decapitated and armless body was found buried in a shallow grave adjacent to the building.

Recent years
During the 2010s there have been several plans to refurbish the residential building; in 2010 there have been plans to refurbish the tower block as well as building low rise housing in the surrounding areas. Planning permission was given in 2010 but refurbishment never occurred. In 2013 a developer attempted to refurbish the tower block into social and student housing, with plans to upgrade the flats with new windows and insulation, however this plan was rejected in 2014.

More recently in 2018, developer Stace LLP has planned to refurbish the residential building, as well as transforming the surrounding area with two 2-bedroom homes, a new block of flats consisting of 41 1-2 bedroom properties and new parking facilities.

References

Residential buildings completed in 1967
Modernist architecture in England